The 2022 Championship League Invitational (officially the 2022 BetVictor Championship League Snooker Invitational) was a professional non-ranking snooker tournament that took place from 20 December 2021 to 4 February 2022 at the Morningside Arena in Leicester, England. It was the 18th staging of the Championship League.

Kyren Wilson was the defending champion, having beaten Mark Williams 3–2 in the final of the previous invitational edition of the tournament. His defence of the title ended in the Group 7 semi-finals, where he was beaten 3–1 by John Higgins.

John Higgins went on to win the tournament for the third time, beating Stuart Bingham 3–2 in the final.

Prize fund 
The breakdown of prize money for the 2022 Championship League is shown below.

Groups 1–7
Winner: £3,000
Runner-up: £2,000
Semi-final: £1,000
Frame-win (league stage): £100
Frame-win (play-offs): £300
Highest break: £500

Winners' Group
Winner: £10,000
Runner-up: £5,000
Semi-final: £3,000
Frame-win (league stage): £200
Frame-win (play-offs): £300
Highest break: £1,000

Tournament total: £184,400

Group 1 
Group 1 was played on 20 and 21 December 2021. Liang Wenbo won the group and qualified for the Winners' Group.

Matches 

 Jack Lisowski 3–1 Zhou Yuelong
 Graeme Dott 3–1 Tom Ford
 Jack Lisowski 0–3 Gary Wilson
 Ryan Day 1–3 Liang Wenbo
 Zhou Yuelong 1–3 Graeme Dott
 Gary Wilson 2–3 Liang Wenbo
 Jack Lisowski 1–3 Graeme Dott
 Tom Ford 2–3 Ryan Day
 Graeme Dott 3–1 Gary Wilson
 Zhou Yuelong 3–1 Tom Ford
 Gary Wilson 2–3 Ryan Day
 Jack Lisowski 3–2 Liang Wenbo
 Tom Ford 1–3 Liang Wenbo
 Zhou Yuelong 1–3 Ryan Day
 Tom Ford 3–1 Gary Wilson
 Graeme Dott 3–2 Ryan Day
 Zhou Yuelong 2–3 Gary Wilson
 Graeme Dott 3–2 Liang Wenbo
 Jack Lisowski 3–1 Ryan Day
 Zhou Yuelong 3–2 Liang Wenbo
 Jack Lisowski 1–3 Tom Ford

Table

Play-offs

Group 2 
Group 2 was played on 22 and 23 December 2021. Graeme Dott won the group and qualified for the Winners' Group.

Matches 

 Xiao Guodong 1–3 Lu Ning
 Joe Perry 3–2 Gary Wilson
 Xiao Guodong 3–2 Graeme Dott
 Ryan Day 2–3 Jack Lisowski
 Lu Ning 3–0 Joe Perry
 Graeme Dott 3–2 Jack Lisowski
 Xiao Guodong 2–3 Joe Perry
 Gary Wilson 0–3 Ryan Day
 Joe Perry 3–1 Graeme Dott
 Lu Ning 2–3 Gary Wilson
 Graeme Dott 2–3 Ryan Day
 Xiao Guodong 3–2 Jack Lisowski
 Gary Wilson 1–3 Jack Lisowski
 Lu Ning 3–2 Ryan Day
 Gary Wilson 0–3 Graeme Dott
 Joe Perry 0–3 Ryan Day
 Lu Ning 1–3 Graeme Dott
 Joe Perry 3–2 Jack Lisowski
 Xiao Guodong 1–3 Ryan Day 
 Lu Ning 3–1 Jack Lisowski
 Xiao Guodong 3–2 Gary Wilson

Table

Play-offs

Group 3 
Group 3 was played on 3 and 4 January 2022. Mark Williams was due to take part in this group, but withdrew and was replaced by Zhao Xintong. Zhao won the group and qualified for the Winners' Group.

Matches 

 Mark Selby 0–3 Zhao Xintong
 Stuart Bingham 2–3 Xiao Guodong
 Mark Selby 2–3 Ryan Day
 Joe Perry 2–3 Lu Ning
 Zhao Xintong 3–1 Stuart Bingham
 Ryan Day 0–3 Lu Ning
 Mark Selby 3–2 Stuart Bingham
 Xiao Guodong 3–2 Joe Perry
 Stuart Bingham 3–0 Ryan Day
 Zhao Xintong 3–2 Xiao Guodong
 Ryan Day 2–3 Joe Perry
 Mark Selby 3–1 Lu Ning
 Xiao Guodong 3–2 Lu Ning
 Zhao Xintong 3–0 Joe Perry
 Xiao Guodong 3–1 Ryan Day
 Stuart Bingham 3–2 Joe Perry
 Zhao Xintong 3–0 Ryan Day
 Stuart Bingham 3–2 Lu Ning
 Mark Selby 3–0 Joe Perry
 Zhao Xintong 3–1 Lu Ning
 Mark Selby 3–0 Xiao Guodong

Table

Play-offs

Group 4 
Group 4 was played on 5 and 6 January 2022. Barry Hawkins was due to take part in this group, but withdrew and was replaced by Scott Donaldson. Stuart Bingham won the group and qualified for the Winners' Group.

Matches 

 Judd Trump 0–3 Scott Donaldson
 Kyren Wilson 3–1 Lu Ning
 Judd Trump 2–3 Stuart Bingham
 Mark Selby 3–2 Xiao Guodong
 Kyren Wilson 3–2 Scott Donaldson
 Stuart Bingham 3–1 Xiao Guodong
 Judd Trump 2–3 Kyren Wilson
 Mark Selby 3–2 Lu Ning
 Kyren Wilson 3–1 Stuart Bingham
 Lu Ning 2–3 Scott Donaldson
 Mark Selby 3–1 Stuart Bingham
 Judd Trump 3–1 Xiao Guodong
 Xiao Guodong 2–3 Lu Ning
 Mark Selby 3–0 Scott Donaldson
 Stuart Bingham 2–3 Lu Ning
 Mark Selby 2–3 Kyren Wilson
 Stuart Bingham 3–0 Scott Donaldson
 Kyren Wilson 3–0 Xiao Guodong
 Mark Selby 3–0 Judd Trump
 Xiao Guodong 1–3 Scott Donaldson
 Judd Trump 3–0 Lu Ning

Table

Play-offs

Group 5 
Group 5 was played on 7 and 8 January 2022. Mark Selby was due to take part in this group, but withdrew and was replaced by Jordan Brown. Scott Donaldson won the group and qualified for the Winners' Group.

Matches 

 Martin Gould 0–3 Scott Donaldson
 David Gilbert 3–1 Lu Ning
 Martin Gould 3–2 Ali Carter
 Kyren Wilson 0–3 Scott Donaldson
 David Gilbert 2–3 Ali Carter
 Kyren Wilson 3–1 Jordan Brown
 Martin Gould 3–1 David Gilbert
 Jordan Brown 3–2 Lu Ning
 David Gilbert 1–3 Scott Donaldson
 Ali Carter 3–1 Lu Ning
 Jordan Brown 3–2 Scott Donaldson
 Kyren Wilson 3–1 Martin Gould
 Kyren Wilson 3–0 Lu Ning
 Ali Carter 0–3 Jordan Brown
 Lu Ning 3–2 Scott Donaldson
 David Gilbert 2–3 Jordan Brown
 Ali Carter 0–3 Scott Donaldson
 Kyren Wilson 2–3 David Gilbert
 Martin Gould 0–3 Jordan Brown
 Kyren Wilson 1–3 Ali Carter
 Martin Gould 3–1 Lu Ning

Table

Play-offs

Group 6 
Group 6 was played on 17 and 18 January 2022. Ricky Walden was due to take part in this group, but withdrew and was replaced by Matthew Selt. Yan Bingtao won the group and qualified for the Winners' Group.

Matches 

 Yan Bingtao 3–1 Ali Carter
 Martin Gould 3–2 Matthew Selt
 Yan Bingtao 3–1 Ding Junhui
 Kyren Wilson 2–3 Jordan Brown
 Matthew Selt 2–3 Ding Junhui
 Ali Carter 3–0 Jordan Brown
 Yan Bingtao 2–3 Matthew Selt
 Martin Gould 3–2 Kyren Wilson
 Ali Carter 3–0 Matthew Selt
 Ding Junhui 3–2 Martin Gould
 Ali Carter 1–3 Kyren Wilson
 Yan Bingtao 3–0 Jordan Brown
 Martin Gould 3–2 Jordan Brown
 Ding Junhui 0–3 Kyren Wilson
 Martin Gould 3–1 Ali Carter
 Kyren Wilson 3–0 Matthew Selt
 Ding Junhui 3–1 Ali Carter
 Matthew Selt 1–3 Jordan Brown
 Yan Bingtao 3–0 Kyren Wilson
 Ding Junhui 3–2 Jordan Brown
 Yan Bingtao 3–0 Martin Gould

Table

Play-offs

Group 7 
Group 7 was played on 1 and 2 February 2022. Neil Robertson was due to take part in this group, but withdrew and was replaced by Ricky Walden. John Higgins won the group and qualified for the Winners' Group.

Matches 

 Ronnie O'Sullivan	0–3 Kyren Wilson
 Ricky Walden 0–3 Ali Carter
 Ronnie O'Sullivan	0–3 John Higgins
 Martin Gould 1–3 Ding Junhui
 Ricky Walden 1–3 John Higgins
 Kyren Wilson 3–0 Martin Gould
 Ronnie O'Sullivan 3–2 Ricky Walden
 Ali Carter 1–3 Ding Junhui
 Ricky Walden 1–3 Kyren Wilson
 John Higgins 0–3 Ali Carter
 Kyren Wilson 3–0 Ding Junhui
 Ronnie O'Sullivan	2–3 Martin Gould
 Martin Gould 1–3 Ali Carter
 John Higgins 3–2 Ding Junhui
 Kyren Wilson 2–3 Ali Carter
 Ricky Walden 2–3 Ding Junhui
 Kyren Wilson 1–3 John Higgins
 Ricky Walden 3–2 Martin Gould
 Ronnie O'Sullivan 3–2 Ding Junhui
 John Higgins 3–1 Martin Gould
 Ronnie O'Sullivan	2–3 Ali Carter

Table

Play-offs

Winners' Group 
The Winners' Group was played on 3 and 4 February 2022. John Higgins won the Championship League for a third time, beating Stuart Bingham 3–2 in the final.

Matches 

 John Higgins 3–2 Graeme Dott
 Stuart Bingham 3–2 Yan Bingtao
 John Higgins 3–1 Zhao Xintong
 Liang Wenbo 3–0 Scott Donaldson
 Zhao Xintong 0–3 Stuart Bingham
 Graeme Dott 0–3 Scott Donaldson
 John Higgins 2–3 Stuart Bingham
 Yan Bingtao 3–0 Liang Wenbo
 Stuart Bingham 3–2 Graeme Dott
 Zhao Xintong 3–2 Yan Bingtao
 Graeme Dott 3–2 Liang Wenbo
 John Higgins 3–2 Scott Donaldson
 Yan Bingtao 3–0 Scott Donaldson
 Zhao Xintong 3–1 Liang Wenbo
 Yan Bingtao 3–0 Graeme Dott
 Stuart Bingham 0–3 Liang Wenbo
 Zhao Xintong 1–3 Graeme Dott
 Stuart Bingham 3–0 Scott Donaldson
 John Higgins 3–1 Liang Wenbo
 Zhao Xintong 2–3 Scott Donaldson
 John Higgins 0–3 Yan Bingtao

Table

Play-offs

Century breaks 
A total of 127 century breaks were made during the tournament.

 143 (W), 138, 125, 122, 100  Zhao Xintong
 142, 138, 138, 135, 128, 114, 111, 110  Yan Bingtao
 142 (2), 132, 122, 113, 110, 101, 101, 100  Ryan Day
 141 (7), 140 (6)  Ali Carter
 141, 139 (3), 137, 133, 130, 119, 110, 108, 104, 102, 100  Stuart Bingham
 140 (6), 135, 134, 129, 128, 128, 121, 119, 118, 112, 102, 100  Kyren Wilson
 140, 131, 117, 116, 113, 112, 111, 101  Xiao Guodong
 140, 118, 112, 106, 103, 100  Jack Lisowski
 138, 134, 134, 131, 131, 127, 105, 101  Ding Junhui
 138 (4), 114, 111, 104, 101  Lu Ning
 136 (1), 119, 116  Zhou Yuelong
 136 (1), 108, 106, 101  Liang Wenbo
 134, 112, 112, 112, 102, 102, 100, 100  John Higgins
 132 (5), 130, 129, 118, 103  Scott Donaldson
 132, 110, 108  Ricky Walden
 131, 129, 127, 125, 108, 100  Mark Selby
 127  David Gilbert
 123, 123, 103  Joe Perry
 123  Tom Ford
 122, 115, 101  Martin Gould
 118, 117, 111, 105  Gary Wilson
 117, 108, 101, 101  Jordan Brown
 116, 106  Ronnie O'Sullivan
 111, 101, 100, 100  Graeme Dott
 110  Matthew Selt
 107, 103  Judd Trump

Bold: highest break in the indicated group.

Winnings 

Green: won the group. Bold: highest break in the group. All prize money in GBP.
Parenthesis: World rankings 2021/2022 (Cut-off point 5) prior to tournament start, 19 December 2021.
Notes
(a) Mark Selby withdrew from the tournament prior to group 5 play.

References 

2021-22
2022 in snooker
2022 in English sport
December 2021 sports events in the United Kingdom
January 2022 sports events in the United Kingdom
February 2022 sports events in the United Kingdom
2021-22 Championship League